The Earle C. Clements Bridge, commonly known as the Shawneetown Bridge, is a cantilever truss bridge carrying Kentucky Route 56 and Illinois Route 13 across the Ohio River. Clements was a former governor of Kentucky. The bridge connects Old Shawneetown, Illinois, to rural Union County, Kentucky. Opened in 1955, it is the only highway bridge over the Ohio between Paducah, Kentucky, and Evansville, Indiana.

The Shawneetown Bridge was featured in a scene in the film U.S. Marshals. The film's crash scene was filmed several miles downstream in Pope County, Illinois.

External links
 Historic Bridges of the U.S. - Shawneetown Bridge

Road bridges in Illinois
Buildings and structures in Union County, Kentucky
Buildings and structures in Gallatin County, Illinois
Bridges completed in 1955
Bridges over the Ohio River
Road bridges in Kentucky
1955 establishments in Illinois
1955 establishments in Kentucky
Cantilever bridges in the United States
Truss bridges in the United States